Woodhorn is a village and former civil parish, now in the parish of Newbiggin by the Sea, in Northumberland, England, about  east of Ashington. In 1931 the parish had a population of 219. The village is sometimes identified with Wucestre, given to St Cuthbert by King Ceolwulf when he gave up his throne in 737 to become a monk at Lindisfarne. A medieval bell at Woodhorn, inscribed "Ave Maria", is said to be one of the oldest in existence.

Governance 
On 1 April 1935 the parish was abolished and merged with Newbiggin by the Sea and Ashington parishes.

Economy 
The main employment was at the coal mine. The mine has since closed and the site has been landscaped incorporating a lake and known as Queen Elizabeth II Country Park. Some of the mine buildings have been retained and are used as a visitor centre.

Landmarks 
Woodhorn Colliery Museum is situated in a country park with a  lake. With sound effects, models, paintings, working machinery etc., the museum gives an insight into life in a local coal-mining community.

The site of the old pit is now the location for Northumberland Record Office, a purpose-built building having been constructed to replace the two previous buildings at Morpeth and Gosforth.

Religious sites 
The church is dedicated to St Mary.

References

External links

GENUKI (Accessed: 27 November 2008) 
 (Woodhorn colliery museum and country park, and the Northumberland archives)

Villages in Northumberland
Former civil parishes in Northumberland
Newbiggin-by-the-Sea